Kolehjub-e Dartang (also Romanized as Kolehjūb-e Dartang) is a village in Dinavar Rural District, Dinavar District, Sahneh County, Kermanshah Province, Iran. At the 2006 census, its population was 142, in 38 families.

References 

Populated places in Sahneh County